Hilir Perak District (Lower Perak) is a district in Perak, Malaysia. The district is governed by Teluk Intan Municipal Council which is based in the town of Teluk Intan. The District council was known as Hilir Perak District Council until 4 April 2004, when it was upgraded to Municipality status. Teluk Intan town is the district's principal urban center while smaller towns include Langkap town.

Teluk Intan town is on the southeast bank of the Perak River, opposite the kampong of Sungai Durian.

Langkap town housing an Immigration Depot which is a detention centre for illegal immigrants around Perak state.

History
In January 2016 Bagan Datuk was declared an autonomous sub-district of Perak and later on 15 June 2016, Bagan Datoh was formed into a new district together with Hutan Melintang, detaching it from Hilir Perak (Teluk Intan). However Teluk Intan retains responsibility for the municipal works in the district.

Administrative divisions

Hilir Perak District is divided into 5 mukims, which are:
 Sungai Durian
 Durian Sebatang
 Changkat Jong
 Sungai Manik
 Labu Kubong

Geography
Hilir Perak is a relatively flat plain compared to Ipoh, the state's capital. With the Perak River flowing through the district, it is a fertile area suitable for agricultural activities.

Demographics

Federal Parliament and State Assembly seats 

List of Hilir Perak district representatives in the Federal Parliament (Dewan Rakyat)

List of Hilir Perak district representatives in the State Legislative Assembly of Perak

Education 
There are a lot of schools that located in this district. The famous daily school are San Min National Type Secondary School, San Min Independent Secondary School, SMK Seri Perak, SMK Horley Methodist, SMK Convent, SMK Sultan Abdul Aziz and SMK St. Anthony. For boarding school, there are
one boarding schools in this district,
Sekolah Menengah Sains Teluk Intan and one technical school, Sekolah Menengah Teknik Teluk Intan.

There are 2 public university branch campuses located in this district. The campuses are UiTM Teluk Intan Campus  of Faculty of Medicine completed in October 2010 and UKM Teluk Intan Campus of Faculty of Medicine (currently under construction) . Both are located beside Hospital Teluk Intan. There are also a community school in Teluk Intan town.

Economic activities
Agriculture and fishing are two main economic activities in Hilir Perak. Almost two-thirds of Hilir Perak's agricultural land is planted with oil palms, while the one third goes to vegetables, paddy, coconuts etc. The biggest fishing town in Hilir Perak is Hutan Melintang, which has about 400 fishing ships of various sizes. Hutan Melintang fishermen sell their catches throughout the country. The vibrant agriculture and fishing industry in Hilir Perak had attracted many foreign workers into Hilir Perak. The fishing industry employs more Thais while Indonesians are largely employed in the agricultural sector.

There is also a light industrial area in Teluk Intan and Langkap which provides many work opportunities to the locals.

Shopping
There are some major shopping centers in Hilir Perak district. They include:

Rapid Mall - Lotus's Teluk Intan
Kompleks Aik Aik
Kompleks Menara Condong
Medan Intan - Billion Shopping Centre
The Store Jalan Ah Cheong
TF Value-Mart

See also

 Districts of Malaysia
 Kampung Pelawan

References